In Still Green Days is a 2015 South Korea morning soap opera starring Song Ha-yoon, Lee Hae-woo, Jung Yi-yeon, and Kim Min-soo. It aired on KBS2 from March 2, 2015, to August 28, 2015, on Mondays to Fridays at 09:00 (KST) to 09:45 (KST).

It is the 38th TV Novel series (7th in 2010s) of KBS.

Summary 
This coming-of-age drama is set in the 1970s.

Cast

Main 
 Song Ha-yoon as Lee Young-hee
 Lee Hae-woo as Seo In-ho
 Jung Yi-yeon as Lee Jung-hee / Jang En-ah
 Kim Min-soo as Park Dong-soo

Supporting

People around Young-hee 
 Park Hyun-suk as Choi Myung-joo
 Oh Mi-yeon as Kim Min-ja
 Kim Yong-seok as Lee Sang-goo
 Yoo Hyun-joo as Lee Mi-jung
 Choi Chang-yeop as Lee Jung-hoon
 Kim Woo-seok as Lee Young-hoon

People around In-ho 
 Choi Dong-yeop as Seo Byung-jin
 Park So-jung as Kang Mi-sun
 Hung Ye-eun as Seo Hye-young

People around En-ah 
 Yoon Hae-young as Jung Deok-hee
 Kim Myung-soo as Jang Yong-taek
 Song Tae-won as Jang Seok-beom

Others 
 Song Tae-yoon as Dongha High student #1

References

External links
  

Korean Broadcasting System television dramas
Korean-language television shows
2015 South Korean television series debuts
2015 South Korean television series endings